Castelnuovo Calcea is a comune (municipality) in the Province of Asti in the Italian region Piedmont, located about  southeast of Turin and about  southeast of Asti.

Main sights
Parish church, built in the late 17th century
Medieval castle, destroyed by Savoyard troops in 1634. Today only the entrance gate and a tower remain.

References

Cities and towns in Piedmont